Basilosauridae is a family of extinct cetaceans. They lived during the middle to the early late Eocene and are known from all continents, including Antarctica.  They were probably the first fully aquatic cetaceans. The group is noted to be a paraphyletic assemblage of stem group whales from which the monophyletic Neoceti are derived.

Characteristics

Some genera tend to show signs of convergent evolution with mosasaurs by having long serpentine body shape, which suggests that this body plan seems to have been rather successful. Basilosaurid forelimbs have broad and fan-shaped scapulae attached to a humerus, radius, and ulna which are flattened into a plane to which the elbow joint was restricted, effectively making pronation and supination impossible. Because of a shortage of forelimb fossils from other archaeocetes, it is not known if this arrangement is unique to basilosaurids, as some of the characteristics are also seen in Georgiacetus.

As archaeocetes, Basilosaurids lacked the telescoping skull of present whales. Their jaws were powerful, with a dentition easily distinguishable from that of other archaeocetes: they lack upper third molars and the upper molars lack protocones, trigon basins, and lingual third roots.  The cheek teeth have well-developed accessory denticles.

Unlike modern whales, basilosaurids possessed small hindlimbs with well defined femur, lower leg and feet. They were, however, very small and did not articulate with the vertebral column, which also lack true sacral vertebrae. While they were unable to support  body weight on land, they might have assisted as claspers during copulation. Analysis of tail vertebrate from Basilosaurus and Dorudon indicate they possessed small flukes.

Taxonomy
Basilosaurinae was proposed as a subfamily containing two genera: Basilosaurus and Basiloterus. They were characterized by elongated distal thoracic vertebrae, lumbar, and proximal sacrococcygeal. All known members of the subfamily are larger than their relatives of the Dorudontinae subfamily except Cynthiacetus.

Systematics
Family Basilosauridae
 Subfamily Basilosaurinae
 Genus Basilosaurus
 Genus Basiloterus
 Genus Basilotritus
 Genus Eocetus
 Subfamily Dorudontinae
 Genus Ancalecetus
 Genus Chrysocetus
 Genus Cynthiacetus
 Genus Dorudon
 Genus Masracetus
 Genus Ocucajea
 Genus Saghacetus
 Genus Stromerius
 Genus Supayacetus
 Genus Zygorhiza
 Subfamily Pachycetinae
 Genus Antaecetus
 Genus Platyosphys

See also

 Evolution of cetaceans
 Leviathan

Notes

References

 
 
 
 
 

 
Prehistoric mammal families
Paraphyletic groups